The following page lists power stations in Mexico.
Mexico has 54852 MW of capacity installed.

Fossil Fuel

Geothermal

Hydroelectric

In service

Out of service

Nuclear

Wind

See also 

Electricity in Mexico
List of power stations in North America
List of largest power stations in the world

References

 CFE - Comisión Federal de Electricidad Hydroelectric Power Stations (in Spanish)

Mexico
 
Power stations